Fenwick Henri Watkins (December 27, 1887 – August 8, 1943) was an American athlete and coach. He attended the University of Vermont, where he starred in football, basketball, and baseball. He was a teammate on the baseball team of two future Major League Baseball players, Larry Gardner and Ray Collins. This trio and the rest of the 1908 Vermont team was one of the most talented in school history, winning a New England championship with a record of 15–9.

After graduating from Vermont, Watkins coached football, basketball, and baseball at Fargo College in Fargo, North Dakota, where he also led the athletic program.

Watkins was born on December 27, 1887, in Burlington, Vermont. He died on August 8, 1943, in Fargo.

Head coaching record

Football

References

1887 births
1943 deaths
20th-century African-American people
African-American baseball coaches
African-American baseball players
African-American basketball coaches
African-American basketball players
African-American coaches of American football
African-American players of American football
American men's basketball players
Basketball coaches from Vermont
Basketball players from Vermont
College men's basketball head coaches in the United States
Concordia Cobbers football coaches
Fargo Hilltoppers football coaches
Forwards (basketball)
Guards (basketball)
North Dakota State Bison baseball coaches
Sportspeople from Burlington, Vermont
Vermont Catamounts baseball players
Vermont Catamounts football players
Vermont Catamounts men's basketball players